Following are the results of the 1957 Soviet First League football championship. FC Avangard Leningrad winning the championship.

First stage

Zone I

Number of teams by republics

Zone II

Number of teams by republics

Zone III

Number of teams by republics

Zone [Russia] Far East

Final stage
 [Nov 17 – Dec 3, Tashkent]

See also
 1957 Soviet Class A
 1957 Soviet Cup

References

 1957 at rsssf.com

1957
2
Soviet
Soviet